Heavy Metal Kings is an underground hip hop duo which consists of veteran rappers Ill Bill (formerly of Non Phixion, currently of La Coka Nostra) and Vinnie Paz (Jedi Mind Tricks and Army of the Pharaohs). In 2006, Ill Bill was featured on the single "Heavy Metal Kings" by hip hop duo Jedi Mind Tricks, released through Babygrande Records. The single was released in a limited edition blue vinyl pressing, with every copy signed by group vocalist Vinnie Paz.

"Heavy Metal Kings" is the lead single from the group's fifth album, Servants in Heaven, Kings in Hell. The song features a sample from "Boiling Rage (Estuans Interius)" by German composer Carl Orff, taken from his famous cantata Carmina Burana, and a vocal sample from "Front Lines (Hell on Earth)" by Mobb Deep for the chorus.  The song's music video was released shortly before the album's release, and featured guest appearances from the group's DJ, DJ Kwestion, and R.A. the Rugged Man.
Ill Bill and Vinnie Paz have since combined forces to form a group of the same name, "Heavy Metal Kings," and record a full self-titled album to be released April 5, 2011, through Enemy Soil/Uncle Howie.

History

2010–2011: Heavy Metal Kings 
Ill Bill and Vinnie Paz have since combined forces to form a group of the same name, "Heavy Metal Kings," and record a full self-titled album to be released April 5, 2011, through Enemy Soil/Uncle Howie.  "Keeper Of The Seven Keys" produced by up and coming producer, C-Lance, is the first track from the new Heavy Metal Kings album.  The album features production from DJ Muggs, Ill Bill, Shuko, Sicknature, C-Lance, Grand Finale, Jack of All Trades, Junior Makhno, Vherbal, and DJ Premier protégé Gemcrates alongside a cast of emcees, including Reef the Lost Cauze, Slaine, Crypt the Warchild, Q-Unique, and Sabac Red.

2012–present: Future Work announcements 
In 2011, an associated producer posted that an album featuring Ill Bill & Vinnie Paz with DJ Muggs (whom Ill Bill had previously collaborated with on an album entitled Kill Devil Hills), entitled Heavy Metal Kings vs. DJ Muggs was in the works. However, in an interview with Ill Bill from 2016, he made it known that this album is no longer being worked on.

In 2017, Heavy Metal Kings released their second album titled Black God White Devil.

Discography 
 2011: Heavy Metal Kings
 2017: Black God White Devil

See also 
 "Heavy Metal Kings" (song)
 Heavy Metal Kings (album)

References 

American musical duos
East Coast hip hop groups
Hip hop duos
Underground hip hop groups
Horrorcore groups
Rappers from New York City
Rappers from Philadelphia
Hardcore hip hop groups